Erhun Aksel Oztumer (born 29 May 1991) is an English professional footballer who plays as a midfielder for Adana Demirspor.

Club career

Early career and Turkey
Following nine years in the youth set up at Charlton Athletic, and a season with Fisher Athletic, 16-year-old Oztumer joined Manisaspor in 2008, who at the time were in the Turkish Süper Lig. Despite featuring mainly for the Manisaspor youth team, in 2009 he earned a move to Sivasspor, also of the Turkish Süper Lig, where he signed his first professional contract. Oztumer never played for the first team at Sivasspor, but played 29 times for the reserve team in A2 Ligi, scoring eight goals. In 2011, Oztumer left Sivasspor to join Anadolu Üsküdar in the TFF Third League, the fourth tier of Turkish football, where he played senior football for the first time, playing 34 league games in 16 months, scoring five goals.

Dulwich Hamlet
Before the start of the 2012–13 season, Oztumer returned to England, joining Isthmian League side Dulwich Hamlet. He went on to score over 60 goals from midfield in all competitions over two seasons, during which time Dulwich won promotion to the Isthmian League Premier Division.

Peterborough United
In June 2014, he moved back into the professional game, joining Peterborough United for an undisclosed fee, leaving with the best wishes of Dulwich Hamlet manager Gavin Rose.

He played one friendly in pre-season, scoring a free kick against St Neots Town, before suffering an injury which kept him out of the early part of the 2014–15 season. He made his Peterborough debut as a substitute in a 2–2 draw with Oldham Athletic on 4 October 2014. He made his first start for the club on 13 December 2014, scoring the winning goal away to Leyton Orient.

Walsall
On 17 June 2016, Oztumer signed for Football League One side Walsall on a two-year contract upon the expiry of his contract at Peterborough. He scored on his debut in a 3–1 win over AFC Wimbledon on 6 August 2016.

At the end of the 2017–18 season he announced his decision to leave Walsall due to his contract expiring.

Bolton Wanderers
On 13 June 2018, Oztumer signed for EFL Championship team Bolton Wanderers on a two-year deal. He scored on his debut, in a 1–2 defeat to Leeds United in the EFL Cup on 14 August. On 15 August 2019 he left the club after handing in his notice due to the club's ongoing financial problems.

Charlton Athletic
On 16 August 2019, Oztumer was announced as a free signing for Charlton Athletic on a two-year deal. He scored his first goal for Charlton in an EFL Trophy tie against AFC Wimbledon on 1 September 2020.

On 18 May 2021, it was announced that Oztumer would leave Charlton Athletic at the end of his contract.

Bristol Rovers (loan)
On 15 October 2020, Oztumter joined Bristol Rovers on a season-long loan. The following day Oztumer came off the bench in the 83 minute of a 1-1 draw with Burton Albion to make his debut. He made his full debut on 7 November against former club Walsall in an FA Cup victory. He scored his first goal with the fourth in a 6–0 thrashing of Darlington in the second round of the FA Cup. In December 2020, it was reported that Oztumer had tested positive for COVID-19 along with teammate Zain Westbrooke.

Fatih Karagümrük
On 1 July 2021, Oztumer moved to Turkey to join Süper Lig side Fatih Karagümrük.

Adana Demirspor
On 27 January 2022, Oztumer joined Adana Demirspor on a contract until June 2023 with the option for a further year.

Personal life
Oztumer is of Turkish Cypriot descent.

Career statistics

Honours
Individual
PFA Team of the Year: 2016–17 League One, 2017–18 League One

References

External links

1991 births
Living people
Footballers from Greenwich
English footballers
Association football midfielders
Sivasspor footballers
Anadolu Üsküdar 1908 footballers
Dulwich Hamlet F.C. players
Peterborough United F.C. players
Walsall F.C. players
Bolton Wanderers F.C. players
Charlton Athletic F.C. players
Bristol Rovers F.C. players
Fatih Karagümrük S.K. footballers
Adana Demirspor footballers
TFF Third League players
Isthmian League players
English Football League players
Süper Lig players
Sportspeople of Turkish Cypriot descent
English people of Turkish Cypriot descent